Mount Lorette is a  summit centrally located in Kananaskis Country in the Canadian Rockies of Alberta, Canada. Mount Lorette's nearest higher peak is Skogan Peak,  to the north-northwest. Mount Lorette is a landmark that can be seen from Highway 40 north of the Kananaskis Village area.


History
It was named in 1922 for Lorette Spur, a ridge to the north of Vimy Ridge which was the scene of very heavy fighting during World War I. Capturing Lorette Spur marked a significant battle in French military history.

The first ascent of the peak was made in 1952 by R.C. Hind, B. Richardson, L. Keeling, J. Manry, J. Dodds, and C. McAllister.

The mountain's name was officially adopted in 1953 by the Geographical Names Board of Canada.

Geology
Mount Lorette is composed of sedimentary rock laid down during the Precambrian to Jurassic periods. Formed in shallow seas, this sedimentary rock was pushed east and over the top of younger rock during the Laramide orogeny.

Climate
Based on the Köppen climate classification, Mount Lorette is located in a subarctic climate with cold, snowy winters, and mild summers. Temperatures can drop below −20 °C with wind chill factors below −30 °C. Precipitation runoff from the mountain drains into the Kananaskis River which is a tributary of the Bow River.

Gallery

See also
Geology of Alberta

References

External links
 Weather forecast: Mount Lorette

Two-thousanders of Alberta
Canadian Rockies
Alberta's Rockies